Protivofazza (in English Antiphase) is the fourth and final album by Russian rock band Gorky Park, released in 1998, originally under Nox Music in Russia.

Background 
Protivofazza  was released two years after its predecessor Stare. Most songs from both albums were recorded in the same sessions in Los Angeles in 1994, because originally the band thought to release a double album (twenty-one songs were recorded and mixed that year), project that was finally discarded. In 1996, they quickly recorded only two new songs composed by Alexei Belov, to complete the fourth album. For this work, the group had softened its sound considerably, with an extensive use of keyboards instead of electric guitar in most songs.

For its concept and name “Protivofazza”, the band said:  "There is a term in electronics, when one phase over the other flips and sound is not what it should be. When a person is swimming against the tide, the same thing happens. Roughly speaking, the antiphase - a contradiction to everything".  According to them, the name would be close to each of their album they always swim against the current.  Protivofazza was released only in Russia.

Two music videos was made for the album: "Jenny Loses Me" and "Liar".

Track listing

Personnel 
 Band members
Alexander "Marshall" Minkov - vocals, bass guitar
Alexei Belov - Guitar
Alexander "Jan" Janenkov - guitar
Alexander Lvov - drums
Nikolai Kuzminih - keyboards

Additional musicians
 Ashot Akopjan - duduk (track # 9)
Ron Powel - percussion 
 Moscow Philharmonic Orchestra - orchestral arrangements

References

External links 
Discogs.com

1998 albums
Gorky Park (band) albums